Vesa Petteri Törnroos (2 September 1982 – 15 April 2020) was a Finnish sports shooter. He competed in the men's trap event at the 2016 Summer Olympics, ranking 11th.

He died of cancer at the age of 37.

References

External links
 

1982 births
2020 deaths
Finnish male sport shooters
Olympic shooters of Finland
People from Pertunmaa
Place of death missing
Shooters at the 2016 Summer Olympics
European Games competitors for Finland
Shooters at the 2019 European Games
Deaths from cancer in Finland
Sportspeople from South Savo